The Dub Room Special is a film produced by Frank Zappa for direct-to-video release in October, 1982. The video combines footage from a performance at the KCET studios in Los Angeles on August 27, 1974, a concert performed at The Palladium, New York City on October 31, 1981, some clay animation segments by Bruce Bickford, and interviews. The 1974 footage was originally conceived as part of the TV special A Token of His Extreme. The entire production was edited in the "Dub Room" at Compact Video, a post-production facility in Burbank, California. A few of the Compact Video staff members have brief appearances.

The videocassette was released in 1982 and was available only through Zappa's mail-order company, which was known by its phone number "818-PUMPKIN". This was produced in small quantities with a plain black and white typed label. Though it had a $49.98 price tag it quickly sold out. The videocassette was sold in both VHS and Beta formats. The Beta version contained a stereo Hi-Fi soundtrack, but not the VHS copy, as the format did not yet have the capability. 

The video was reissued on DVD on October 17, 2005 with some interview sections trimmed. In 2007 a soundtrack with the same name was released. In 2013 the original 1974 "A Token Of His Extreme" video was released on DVD.

Track listing
 "Kim?"/The Dog Breath Variations/Uncle Meat
 Room Service
Nig Biz
 Approximate
 Cosmik Debris
 Cocaine Decisions
 "The Massimo Bassoli Instant Italian Lesson"/Montana
 "In Case You Didn't Know"/Tengo Na Minchia Tanta
 Florentine Pogen
 Stevie's Spanking
 Stink-Foot
 Flakes
 Inca Roads
 Easy Meat
 "Huh-Huh-Huh"

The following interview sections on the original videocassette version were cut from the DVD re-issue: 
Zappa talking about Compact Video (originally preceded Room Service)
Intermission (after Florentine Pogen) with title cards and Zappa talking about bad continuity

Musicians

August 1974 band
Frank Zappa - Guitar, vocals and percussion
George Duke - Keyboards and vocals
Ruth Underwood - Percussion
Chester Thompson - Drums
Tom Fowler - Bass
Napoleon Murphy Brock - Flute, saxophone and vocals

October 1981 band
Frank Zappa - Lead guitar and vocals
Ray White - Guitar and vocals 
Steve Vai - Guitar and vocals
Tommy Mars - Keyboards and vocals 
Bobby Martin - Keyboards, saxophone and vocals 
Ed Mann - Percussion and vocals
Scott Thunes - Bass and vocals 
Chad Wackerman - Drums

External links
 
 
 Info at globalia.net

1982 video albums
1982 direct-to-video films
1982 films
1982 animated films
American films with live action and animation
Films directed by Frank Zappa
1980s musical films
Films scored by Frank Zappa
Films set in 1974
Films set in 1981
Films shot in Los Angeles
Films shot in New York City
Clay animation films
Films using stop-motion animation
1980s stop-motion animated films
1980s English-language films